The 2015 Gran Piemonte was the 99th edition of the Gran Piemonte (known as Giro del Piemonte until 2009) one-day cycling race. The race returned in 2015 after three years, because the 2013 and 2014 editions were not raced due to economical and organizational problems. It was held on 2 October, one day after the Milano–Torino and two days before Il Lombardia (the last "monument classic" of the season), as part of the Trittico di Autunno. Riders with the characteristics of sprinter or puncheur were the favourites for the victory. The race was won by Jan Bakelants, who attacked in the final  and held off the bunch to take a solo victory. Matteo Trentin won the bunch sprint for second place ahead of Sonny Colbrelli.

Teams
A total of 20 teams took part in the race, 12 World Tour teams and 8 Professional Continental teams.

Result

References

2015 UCI Europe Tour
2015 in Italian sport
Giro del Piemonte